Greer Heritage Museum is a local history museum in Greer, South Carolina, near the Greenville-Spartanburg International Airport. The museum was founded by Carmela B. Hudson (1920-2017), a native of New Haven, Connecticut, a member of the U.S. Army Nurse Corps in World War II, a graduate of Furman University, and an elementary school teacher and librarian. Hudson "built the collection from nothing, pulled together a board of directors, and established a non-profit." In 2008, the museum moved to the former Greer post office built in 1935, where its collections were displayed under the direction of another former librarian and English professor, Joada Hiatt, a native of Kentucky. After Hiatt moved from Greer and local interest in the museum had declined, the board, in 2021, chose as director, David Lovegrove, a native of Idaho and chief marketing officer for Bob Jones University. Lovegrove spearheaded a museum revitalization. 

The museum's exhibits include displays on Native Americans, agriculture, the textile industry, late 19th-century upper-middle-class life, and popular culture in the mid-20th century. 

The museum is located in the former Greer Post Office, a building listed on the National Register of Historic Places. The Colonial Revival-style post office was constructed in 1935 under the supervision of the Public Works Administration during the New Deal era and designed by New York City-based architect Donald G. Anderson, with Louis A. Simon named as supervising architect. Unlike this post office, most New Deal-era buildings were designed by in-house architects. 

The former post office lobby features a mural, "Cotton and Peach Growing," painted in 1940 by the obscure artist Winfield Walkley (1909–1954). Although the mural was roughly handled and covered with paneling when the post office became the Greer city hall in 1968, the paneling was removed in 2008 following acquisition of the property by the museum. The mural is one of 13 commissioned between 1938 and 1941 by the US Department of Treasury's Section of Fine Arts for South Carolina federal buildings and post offices. In 1964, the building was sold to the city of Greer for use as a city hall.

References

External links
 City of Greer: Greer Heritage Museum

National Register of Historic Places in Spartanburg County, South Carolina
Buildings and structures in Spartanburg County, South Carolina
Greer, South Carolina
Museums in Spartanburg County, South Carolina
Public Works Administration in South Carolina